Gabriel Botha (born 23 March 1962) is a South African cricketer. He played in two first-class matches for Boland in 1990/91.

See also
 List of Boland representative cricketers

References

External links
 

1962 births
Living people
South African cricketers
Boland cricketers
Cricketers from Johannesburg